Clube Atlético Lemense, commonly known as Lemense, is a currently inactive Brazilian football club based in Leme, São Paulo.

History
The club was founded on 4 October 2005, after Esporte Clube Lemense closed its football department in 2004. Clube Atlético Lemense was founded to fill the spot left by the other club.

Stadium
Lemense play their home games at Estádio Municipal Bruno Lazzarini, nicknamed Brunão. The stadium has a maximum capacity of 7,659 people.

References

Inactive football clubs in Brazil
 
Association football clubs established in 2005
2005 establishments in Brazil